Çağla Büyükakçay (born 28 September 1989) is a Turkish professional tennis player.

She has won 12 singles and 15 doubles titles on the ITF Women's Circuit. In September 2016, she reached her highest singles ranking of world No. 60. She won her first title on the WTA Tour at her home tournament in Istanbul. On 29 February 2016, she peaked at world No. 111 in the WTA doubles rankings.

Playing for Turkey at the Billie Jean King Cup, Büyükakçay has a win–loss record of 39–30. She is also the top-ranked tennis player at Istanbul's multi-sports club Enkaspor. Büyükakçay was the first tennis player to represent Turkey at the Olympic Games. She competed at the 2016 Rio Olympics .

Career

She did not contest many junior tournaments, only playing four before competing at the senior level. After a few aborted starts, Büyükakçay played her first professional match at an ITF event in Istanbul in May 2004. Losing in the qualifying draw, she would play two more tournaments during the 2004 season. She won her first ever Fed Cup match in 2005, partnering Pemra Özgen to defeat Stephanie Pace and Stephanie Sullivan of Malta. She made her WTA debut at the İstanbul Cup, but lost to Elena Vesnina in the first round. She continued to compete in 10k and 25k events for the remainder of the year.

Büyükakçay began the 2006 season in Ramat HaSharon, but fell there in qualifying to Katariina Tuohimaa. She did not win a main-draw match until April, when she made it to the second round of a $10k tournament in Chennai. She again played for Turkey in Fed Cup, registering a straight-sets win over Olfa Dhaoui of Tunisia. She partnered again with Pemra Özgen, this time double bageling Sigurlaug Sigurdardottir and Iris Staub of Iceland. She reached her first singles and doubles finals simultaneously in Antalya, losing the singles final but winning the doubles with Alena Bayarchyk. She continued mainly on the ITF Circuit but would not reach another final until September, when she made it to the final of in Istanbul. Büyükakçay continued to gain experience during the 2007 season, recording her first ever singles title in Istanbul.

In 2008, Büyükakçay won her second singles title in Gaziantep. She proceeded to enter a mix of lower and higher-level ITF tournaments with some success, including a quarterfinal appearance at a $50k tournament in Penza, going down to Julia Glushko in a tough three-set match. She ended the season on a high, capturing the doubles title with Lucía Sainz in Vinaros. Büyükakçay recorded her first singles title of the 2009 season in Istanbul before returning to the city two weeks later. Having been awarded a wildcard into the 2009 İstanbul Cup, she drew Lucie Hradecká and led the Czech by a set before succumbing in three sets. She did not compete in any other WTA tournaments for the rest of the year.

Büyükakçay had an exceptional 2010 season – she remained undefeated during the Fed Cup, winning three singles matches and dropping only four games in the process. She followed up her Fed Cup success the following week, winning the biggest singles title of her career at a $25k tournament in Kharkiv. She won another $25k title in Valladolid in July before returning to Istanbul to play at the İstanbul Cup. Having bowed out in the first round to Elena Baltacha, she entered the doubles draw with Pemra Özgen and reached the semifinals. It was the first WTA-level semifinal in her career – in singles or doubles. She went on to make history when she entered the US Open qualifying draw. Although she lost in the qualifying first round, it was a major achievement in that no other Turkish woman had previously entered qualifying of a Grand Slam tournament. She continued on the tour and reached another final in Esperance, Western Australia, losing to Sacha Jones of New Zealand.

Her first 2011 tournament was the Australian Open, winning one qualifying match before going down to Corinna Dentoni. She began to combine her schedule with more WTA events but did not reach another final until July, when she lost to Garbiñe Muguruza in Caceras. At the US Open, she lost in the second round of qualifying to Mandy Minella of Luxembourg. In October, she lost in the final of a $25k event in Netanya, narrowly losing to Dinah Pfizenmaier in three sets. However, she did win the doubles crown with Pemra Özgen for her 15th doubles title.

In 2012, Büyükakçay managed to record appearances in the finals of three $25k tournaments in Moscow, Zwevegem, and Istanbul, but lost each one to Margarita Gasparyan, Anastasija Sevastova, and Richèl Hogenkamp. She experienced more success in Fed Cup play, winning three singles and one doubles match for Turkey. Büyükakçay was in touching distance of a main-draw berth at the 2013 Australian Open, but lost in the final round of qualifying to Lesia Tsurenko in straight sets. She reached the semifinals of a $25k event in Namangan but was defeated by Oksana Kalashnikova in close three-set encounter. At the French Open, she scraped past Nastassja Burnett in the first qualifying round, but was soundly beaten in the second by Arantxa Parra Santonja. She would rebound; however, when she reached the final of another $25k tournament in Moscow the following week, finishing runner-up to young Anett Kontaveit of Estonia. She maintained her solid performance for the rest of the season, picking up doubles titles in Shrewsbury, Loughborough, Istanbul, and Ankara.

Büyükakçay experienced a shaky start to the 2014 season – suffering three-set losses to Ashleigh Barty and Kateřina Siniaková in Australia. Although she advanced to the quarterfinals at a $25k event in Sunderland, she only managed to win one singles match at the Fed Cup in Hungary. She was then granted wildcards into the prestigious WTA tournaments in Doha and Dubai, but was beaten in the first round of both by Karolína Plíšková and Zhang Shuai, respectively. She began to pick up form in April, when she won her first singles title in nearly four years in Edgbaston, defeating Frenchwoman Pauline Parmentier. A week later, she advanced to her first ever WTA quarterfinal in Kuala Lumpur and at the French Open, she again came close to a spot in the main draw, but was defeated in the final round of qualifying by Aleksandra Wozniak. At Wimbledon, she was beaten in the first round of qualifying and only managed to win one match during the entire grass-court season.

2015

Büyükakçay played her first tournament of the year in Shenzhen, where she came through qualifying to make the main draw. She defeated Lara Arruabarrena in the first round. However, in the second round, she was defeated by former world No. 2, Vera Zvonareva, in straight sets. Büyükakçay made her way to Australia, where she competed to qualify for the main draw for the Australian Open. She defeated Nigina Abduraimova and Viktorija Golubic, but then lost to Tatjana Maria in the final round of qualifying, in straight sets.

In February, Büyükakçay represented Turkey at the 2015 Fed Cup in Group 1 Europe/Africa, in which she had great success. Her most notable wins came when she defeated both Heather Watson and Elina Svitolina, who both were ranked in the top 50. Büyükakçay won all of her singles matches during the 2015 Fed Cup. Her excellent performance was recognized when she was nominated and won the Fed Cup Heart Award, in which she was given the opportunity to donate $1,000 to her chosen charity. Büyükakçay donated the money to the Association of Supporting the Civil Life.

2016: Breakthrough and first WTA Tour title
Her first tournaments were the Shenzhen Open, where she lost in the second round of qualifying to Yaroslava Shvedova, and the Australian Open, where she was defeated in the first round of qualifying by Maria Sakkari. After reaching the second round in an ITF tournament in Andrézieux-Bouthéon and losing in the first round of qualifying at the Dubai Tennis Championships, Büyükakçay received a wildcard for the Qatar Open. She defeated Lucie Hradecká before upsetting No. 7 seed and defending champion Lucie Safarová in straight sets. In the third round, she lost to Roberta Vinci.

Her next tournament was the Malaysian Open, where she defeated Laura Siegemund and Chang Kai-chen before losing to eventual finalist Eugenie Bouchard. She then played at the Miami Open where she lost in the first round of qualifying to Naomi Broady. She also lost in the first round at an ITF event in Osprey. At the Volvo Car Open, she reached the first round as a qualifier (beating Julia Boserup and Ysaline Bonaventure) where she lost to Danka Kovinić. At the İstanbul Cup, she beat Marina Melnikova, Sorana Cîrstea, Nao Hibino and Stefanie Vögele en route. She then avenged her loss to Kovinic, beating the Montenegrin in three sets and becoming the first Turkish woman to lift a WTA title.

Prior to the French Open, Büyükakçay reached the second round of an ITF tournament in Trnava, losing to Kateřina Siniaková. At the second Grand Slam tournament of the year, she entered as qualifier (beating Elitsa Kostova, Petra Martić and Klára Koukalová en route) and became the first Turkish woman to win a Grand Slam match by beating Aliaksandra Sasnovich in three sets but then lost to Anastasia Pavlyuchenkova. She started her grass-court season at the Nottingham Open where she lost to Caroline Wozniacki in the first round. Her next three tournaments, including Wimbledon, also ended in early exits.

At the 2016 Rio Olympics, Büyükakçay faced Ekaterina Makarova in the first round and lost in three sets. She was the first Turkish woman to compete at the Olympics for tennis.

Performance timelines

Only main-draw results in WTA Tour, Grand Slam tournaments, Fed Cup/Billie Jean King Cup and Olympic Games are included in win–loss records.

Singles
Current after the 2021 US Open.

Notes

WTA career finals

Singles: 1 (1 title)

Doubles: 2 (2 runner-ups)

ITF Circuit finals

Singles: 28 (12 titles, 16 runner–ups)

Doubles: 23 (15 titles, 8 runner–ups)

Fed Cup
Büyükakçay debuted for the Turkey Fed Cup team in 2004. Since then, she has a 26–16 singles record and a 13–14 doubles record (39–30 overall).

Singles (26–16)

Doubles (13–14)

 RR = Round Robin
 PPO = Promotional Play-off
 RPO = Relegation Play-off
 PO = Play-off

Top-10 wins

See also
 Turkish women in sports

References

External links
 
 
 

1989 births
Living people
Turkish female tennis players
Sportspeople from Adana
Enkaspor tennis players
Olympic tennis players of Turkey
Tennis players at the 2016 Summer Olympics
Mediterranean Games gold medalists for Turkey
Mediterranean Games silver medalists for Turkey
Competitors at the 2009 Mediterranean Games
Competitors at the 2013 Mediterranean Games
Mediterranean Games medalists in tennis